Encyclopedia Cthulhiana is a reference guide to the invented places, beings, and concepts from the Cthulhu Mythos developed by H. P. Lovecraft and others. It was published by Chaosium in 1994.

Description
Encyclopedia Cthulhiana is a 400-page book by Daniel Harms that contains an alphabetized listing of entities, cults and lore from H.P. Lovecraft's Cthulhu Mythos that were published during the twentieth century. Sources include works by Ramsey Campbell, Robert Bloch, and Stephen King, as well as scenarios from the Call of Cthulhu game. There are also suggestions about how this information could be included in a Call of Cthulhu adventure or campaign.

An expanded 423-page second edition was published in 1998.

Reception
In Dragon magazine #218 (June 1995), Rick Swan stated that this book possessed "a diligence on the part of the researchers that borders on the superhuman".

Awards
Encyclopedia Cthulhiana won a Special Achievement Award at the 1995 Origins Awards.

Reviews
Dragon #252
Pyramid

References

1994 books
1998 books
Cthulhu Mythos
Encyclopedias of fictional worlds
Origins Award winners
Works based on The Call of Cthulhu